Moiynkum is a district of Jambyl Region in south-eastern Kazakhstan. The administrative center of the district is the auyl of Moiynkum.

Geography
The district is named after the Moiynkum Desert. Parts of it are in the lower basin of the Chu river, as well as by :Lake Balkhash. Lakes Kashkanteniz and Karakol are located in the district.

References

Districts of Kazakhstan
Jambyl Region